Schafstädt was a municipality in the Saalekreis district, in Saxony-Anhalt, Germany. It is situated approximately 17 km southwest of Halle (Saale). Since January 2008, it is part of the town Bad Lauchstädt.

Former municipalities in Saxony-Anhalt
Saalekreis